Shivayogi Sri Puttayyajja is a 2016 Indian Kannada biographical film directed by Hamsa Vijetha and produced by Shyam Mukund Navale. Starring Vijay Raghavendra in the titular role, the film also featured Shruti, Shashikumar, Anu Prabhakar and Abhijith in other pivotal roles. The film is based on the real life of Pandit Puttaraja Gawai (1914 - 2010), who was a scholar and a Hindustani traditional musician who was well noted for his social services.

The film, upon release was critically acclaimed and won awards at the Karnataka State Awards for Best Social Film and Best Actor to Vijay Raghavendra. The musical score composed and written by Amara Priya.

Cast
 Vijay Raghavendra as Puttaraj Gawai
 Shruti
 Anu Prabhakar
 Shashikumar
 Abhijith
 Bhavyashree Rai
 Shankarlinga Sugnalli
 Umesh Navale
 Ramananda Nayak

Production
Hamsa Vijetha, the granddaughter of producer Vijaya Kumar and daughter of actor Viswavijetha, was selected to direct the script by Umesh Puranik Mata. Actor Vijay Raghavendra was initially reluctant to accept the offer to play the titular role since it would require a lot of sincere dedication and time. Later he agreed to star in the film with Shruti, Anu Prabhakar and Shashikumar also being roped in to play supporting roles. The film was shot in Gadag, Badami and Pattadakal regions of Karnataka state where Gawai used to live.

Legal issues
The film faced legal troubles post its shooting and was stayed from its release. The stay order was put forth by producer Maruthi Jediyavar who claimed that he had acquired the rights to do a film on the legendary musician. However, after a certain delay, the court withdrew the stay order and gave a clean chit to release the film. The initial plan to release was on 15 January 2016 which was postponed to 5 February 2016.

Soundtrack 
The music of the film was composed by Amara Priya. The soundtrack features 16 tracks which include a poetry compilation of Puttaraj Gawai, Basavanna, Shishunala Sharif and Amara Priya himself.

Awards
The film has won the following awards since its release.

2015-16 Karnataka State Film Awards
 Won – Karnataka State Film Award for Best Social film
 Won – Karnataka State Film Award for Best Actor – Vijay Raghavendra

References

2016 films
2010s Kannada-language films
Indian biographical films
Indian musical films
2010s biographical films
2010s musical films